The World War II Memorial is a national memorial in Washington, D.C.

World War II Memorial may also refer to:

United States
World War II Memorial (Charlestown, Boston), Massachusetts
World War II Memorial (Fenway–Kenmore, Boston), Massachusetts
World War II Memorial (Houston), Texas
World War II Memorial (Olympia, Washington)

See also
:Category:World War II memorials